Łagiewniki  is a village in Dzierżoniów County, Lower Silesian Voivodeship, in south-western Poland. It is the seat of the administrative district (gmina) called Gmina Łagiewniki.

The village has a population of 2,900.

From 1975 to 1998 the village was in Wrocław Voivodeship.

References

Villages in Dzierżoniów County